Surfdale is a settlement on Waiheke Island in northern New Zealand. The original name being Okahu, Surfdale beach on Huruhi Bay has tidal mudflats, and is often used for windsurfing or kitesurfing. Shelly beach on Pukiki Bay is sandy and shelly. The area was developed in the mid–1920s.

Demographics

Surfdale had a population of 2,067 at the 2018 New Zealand census, an increase of 186 people (9.9%) since the 2013 census, and an increase of 369 people (21.7%) since the 2006 census. There were 789 households, comprising 1,023 males and 1,044 females, giving a sex ratio of 0.98 males per female. The median age was 43.2 years (compared with 37.4 years nationally), with 366 people (17.7%) aged under 15 years, 315 (15.2%) aged 15 to 29, 1,023 (49.5%) aged 30 to 64, and 366 (17.7%) aged 65 or older.

Ethnicities were 86.2% European/Pākehā, 11.3% Māori, 3.2% Pacific peoples, 5.2% Asian, and 6.8% other ethnicities. People may identify with more than one ethnicity.

The percentage of people born overseas was 32.7, compared with 27.1% nationally.

Although some people chose not to answer the census's question about religious affiliation, 60.5% had no religion, 23.9% were Christian, 0.7% had Māori religious beliefs, 0.7% were Hindu, 1.5% were Buddhist and 3.9% had other religions.

Of those at least 15 years old, 504 (29.6%) people had a bachelor's or higher degree, and 213 (12.5%) people had no formal qualifications. The median income was $31,700, compared with $31,800 nationally. 330 people (19.4%) earned over $70,000 compared to 17.2% nationally. The employment status of those at least 15 was that 843 (49.6%) people were employed full-time, 303 (17.8%) were part-time, and 45 (2.6%) were unemployed.

Education

Two of the three schools on Waiheke Island are on Donald Bruce Road in the Surfdale area.

Waiheke High School is a secondary school (Year 7–13) with  a roll of  students.
Te Huruhi Primary School is a contributing primary school (Year 1–6) with a roll of  students. Both schools are coeducational.  Rolls are as of

References

Populated places on Waiheke Island